The Amalgamated Society of Textile Workers and Kindred Trades (ASTWKT) was a trade union representing textile workers, principally silk manufacturing, in the United Kingdom.

Leek Textile Federation
By 1907, Leek had eight small trade unions representing textile workers, most of whom worked with silk.  Six of the unions were led by William Bromfield, and the remaining two by William Stubbs.  That year, the Leek Textile Federation, and all the unions other than the  Silk Twisters' Society affiliated.  Bromfield defeated Stubbs to become the federation's secretary.

The federation's affiliates were:

The organisation later became known as the Midland Textile Federation, as some of the unions had members in other parts of Staffordshire and Cheshire.  It affiliated to the Labour Party, and at the 1918 UK general election, it successfully sponsored Bromfield as a Parliamentary candidate:

History
In October 1919, the unions merged, forming the Amalgamated Society of Textile Workers and Kindred Trades.  The Twisters still chose to remain separate, and eventually dissolved, in 1939.

By 1920, the union had 10,485 members.  It focused on pay and conditions, and also on welfare benefits for members.  It did not undertake any strikes, although it supported the UK General Strike, and organised backing for it in Leek.  Membership fell in the 1930s, averaging 4,500 that decade, with the majority being women, and dropped further to only 2,059 in 1946.

In 1951, the union affiliated to the Amalgamated Weavers' Association, but this was not a success, and it left a few years later, in order to cut its expenses.  In 1965, it absorbed with the National Silk Weavers' and Textile Traders' Association, meaning that for the first time it had members outside Cheshire and Staffordshire, although only in a limited number of locations: Dunfermline, Farnworth, Great Yarmouth and Pontypridd.  This took membership up to 7,000.

Membership began falling again, and by 1982 was down to 3,561.  In 1992, the union renamed itself as the Union of Textile Workers, and in 2000, it merged into the Manufacturing, Science and Finance union.

Leadership

General Secretaries
1919: William Bromfield
1942: Tom Birch
1946: Bert Lisle
1983: Alfred Hitchmough

Presidents
1919: Albert Chattaway
1948: Harold Forrester
1963: Frank Stubbs
1965: John Watson

1980s: Harry Braley
1990s: Sean Hulme

Further reading
Frank Burchill and Jim Sweeney, A history of trade unionism in the North Staffordshire textile industry

References

Defunct trade unions of the United Kingdom
1919 establishments in the United Kingdom
Textile and clothing trade unions
Trade unions established in 1919
2000 disestablishments in the United Kingdom
Trade unions disestablished in 2000
Trade unions based in Staffordshire